A yoke is a shaped pattern piece that forms part of a garment, usually fitting around the neck and shoulders or around the hips to provide support for looser parts of the garment, such as a gathered skirt or the body of a shirt. Yoke construction was first seen in the 19th century. Bodice yokes were first seen in the 1880s, while the yoke skirt, a skirt suspended from a fitted hip yoke, was first seen in 1898.

References

Parts of clothing
Tops (clothing)